William Smith Mesick (August 26, 1856 – December 1, 1942) was a politician from the U.S. state of Michigan.

Mesick was born in Newark, New York and attended the common schools.  He moved to Michigan and attended Kalamazoo Business College and graduated from the law department of the University of Michigan at Ann Arbor in 1881.  He was admitted to the bar in 1881 and commenced the practice of his profession in Mancelona.  He was prosecuting attorney of Antrim County for one term.

In 1896, Mesick was elected as a Republican from Michigan's 11th congressional district to the 55th Congress and re-elected in 1898 to the 56th, serving from March 4, 1897 to March 3, 1901.   During the 56th Congress, he was chairman of the Committee on Elections No. 3.  He was an unsuccessful candidate for re-nomination in 1900, losing in the Republican primaries to Archibald B. Darragh.

After leaving Congress, Mesick resumed the practice of his profession in Mancelona and subsequently moved to Petoskey, Michigan and continued practice.  He died in Petoskey and is interred there at Greenwood Cemetery.

References

The Political Graveyard

1856 births
1942 deaths
Burials in Michigan
University of Michigan Law School alumni
Michigan lawyers
Republican Party members of the United States House of Representatives from Michigan
People from Newark, New York
People from Petoskey, Michigan
People from Antrim County, Michigan
19th-century American lawyers
20th-century American lawyers
19th-century American politicians
20th-century American politicians